Leptopsilopa atrimana is a species of shore flies in the family Ephydridae.

Distribution
Canada, United States, Mexico, Guatemala.

References

Ephydridae
Insects described in 1878
Diptera of North America
Taxa named by Hermann Loew